Tannerella forsythia is an anaerobic, Gram-negative bacterial species of the Bacteroidota phylum. It has been implicated in periodontal diseases and is a member of the red complex of periodontal pathogens.  T. forsythia was previously named Bacteroides forsythus and Tannerella forsythensis.

Tannerella forsythia was discovered by and named after Anne Tanner, who works at The Forsyth Institute located in Cambridge, Massachusetts.

T. forsythia has been identified in atherosclerotic lesions. Lee et al. found that infecting mice with T. forsythia induced foam cell formation and accelerated the formation of atherosclerotic lesions.  It has also been isolated from women with bacterial vaginosis.  The presence of oral T. forsythia has been found to be associated with an increased risk of esophageal cancer.

See also 
 List of bacterial vaginosis microbiota

References

Further reading

External links 

 NIH/Medline
 CDC
 Pelvic Inflammatory Disease (PID; Salpingitis, Endometritis)
 Type strain of Tannerella forsythia at BacDive -  the Bacterial Diversity Metadatabase

Bacteroidia
Inflammatory diseases of female pelvic organs
Reproductive system
Gynaecology
Sexual health
Bacterial vaginosis